100 Rogues is a role-playing video game developed and published by Dinofarm Games and Fusion Reactions for iOS in 2010, and for Ouya in 2013.

Reception

The iOS version received "favorable" reviews according to the review aggregation website Metacritic.

References

2010 video games
IOS games
Ouya games
Role-playing video games
Single-player video games
Video games developed in the United States